The Girls on Film is a web series created by Jeff Hammond, Ashleigh Harrington and Cat McCormick, directed by Hammond, and starring Harrington and a variety of guest stars. It premiered on YouTube on 20 December 2010. Each episode is around three to seven minutes long. The project recreates movie scenes originally played by men, with women taking the starring roles.
The Girls on Film is listed as one of the top websites for Film Geeks in Leslie Simon's book, Geek Girls Unite: Why Fangirls, Bookworms, Indie Chicks, and Other Misfits Will Inherit the Earth.

References

External links 
 The Girls on Film official site
 IMDB
 YouTube

2010 web series debuts
Canadian drama web series
2010s YouTube series